Jogipet is a town in a riverine area of Warri North Local Government Area of Delta State, South South Nigeria. Situated off the busy Benin-Sapele expressway, the port town of Koko is some 20 minutes drive from the major town of Oghara, headquarters of Ethiope West Local Government Area of Delta State and hometown of Chief James Ibori, former governor of Delta State. One of the remarkable history of the town is that it was home to Nana Olomu, who contributed immensely to its significance and growth.

The village is no moreIn recent times the small town drew the world's attention after it was discovered that it was one out of several West African ports being used by waste brokers to dump toxic waste. Till date, the Koko community have not recovered from the incident of toxic waste dump.

References 

Populated places in Delta State